Rodrygo Silva de Goes (born 9 January 2001), simply known as Rodrygo, is a Brazilian professional footballer who plays as a forward for La Liga club Real Madrid and the Brazil national team.

He began his career with Santos, where he played 80 games and scored 17 goals before a €45 million transfer to Real Madrid in 2019.  At international level, Rodrygo made his senior debut for Brazil in 2019, aged only 18.

Club career

Santos
Born in Osasco, São Paulo, Rodrygo joined Santos' youth setup in 2011 at the age of ten, initially assigned to the futsal team. In March 2017, with the first team regulars in Peru for a Copa Libertadores match against Sporting Cristal, he was called up to the first team by manager Dorival Júnior to complete training.

On 21 July 2017, Rodrygo signed his first professional contract, after agreeing to a five-year deal. On 1 November, he was promoted to the main squad by interim manager Elano.

Rodrygo made his first team – and Série A – debut on 4 November 2017, coming on as a late substitute for Bruno Henrique in a 3–1 home win against Atlético Mineiro. The following 25 January he scored his first senior goal, netting a last-minute winner in a 2–1 Campeonato Paulista away win against Ponte Preta.

Rodrygo made his Copa Libertadores debut on 1 March 2018, replacing Eduardo Sasha in a 2–0 away loss against Real Garcilaso; aged 17 years and 50 days, he became the youngest player of Santos to appear in the competition. Fifteen days later he scored his first goal in the tournament, netting his team's second through an individual effort in a 3–1 win against Nacional at the Pacaembu Stadium; at the age of 17 years, two months and six days, he became the youngest Brazilian to score in the competition before his record was broken by fellow Santos youth graduates Kaiky and Ângelo.

Rodrygo scored his first goal in the main category of Brazilian football on 14 April 2018, netting the last in a 2–0 home win against Ceará. On 3 June, he scored a hat-trick and also assisted Gabriel's last goal in a 5–2 home routing of Vitória.

On 26 July 2018, Rodrygo changed his jersey number from 43 to 9 (a number he already wore during the Libertadores). For the 2019 campaign, he again switched numbers, now to jersey 11, previously worn by fellow youth graduate Neymar.

Real Madrid
On 15 June 2018, Real Madrid reached an agreement with Santos for the transfer of Rodrygo, with the player joining Los Blancos in June 2019 and signing until 2025. The rumoured fee was of €45 million, with Santos receiving €40 million as the club owned 80% of his rights with the rest owned by Rodrygo's agents.

On 25 September 2019, Rodrygo made his first team debut and scored his first league goal against Osasuna within a mere minute. He scored his first hat-trick, being a perfect hat-trick, and gave an assist for the club on 6 November, aged 18 years and 301 days old, against Galatasaray in a 6–0 win in the 2019–20 UEFA Champions League season. The second youngest ever to score a hat-trick in the competition, he is also the first player born in the 21st century to score in the tournament. In his first season, he managed to make 19 appearances, while scoring two goals during the league season, as Real Madrid won the 2019–20 La Liga. On 3 November 2020, Rodrygo scored the winning goal in a 3–2 victory over Inter Milan in the 2020–21 UEFA Champions League.

On 12 April 2022, after coming on as a substitute in the second leg of the 2021–22 UEFA Champions League quarter-final tie against Chelsea, he scored with a volleyed finish to send the game into extra-time, in which Karim Benzema scored the winner from a header, allowing Real Madrid to progress into the semi-finals. On 30 April, Rodrygo helped Real clinch their 35th La Liga title after scoring twice in a 4–0 win against Espanyol at the Bernabéu. On 4 May, while trailing 0–1 (3–5 on aggregate) in the second leg of the Champions League semi-final tie against Manchester City, he scored two goals between the 89th and 91st minutes to level the tie and send the game into extra-time. Benzema scored a penalty to win the game 3–1, allowing Real Madrid to progress into the final against Liverpool with an aggregate score of 6–5 and eventually win the tournament. Following the turnaround win against City and other recent last-minute winning contributions, Rodrygo’s impact on the team was praised despite his young age and he quickly turned into a cult hero at Madrid.

International career
On 30 March 2017, Rodrygo was called up to Brazil under-17s for the year's Montaigu Tournament. He made his debut in the championship by scoring his side's only goal in a 2–1 loss against Denmark, and netted two more against Cameroon and United States.

On 7 March 2018, Rodrygo and Santos teammate Yuri Alberto were called up to the under-20s, but both were cut from the squad six days later after a request from his club's president.

In November 2019, Rodrygo was called up for the first time to the Brazil senior team, for the Superclásico de las Américas against rivals Argentina in Riyadh, Saudi Arabia. In the 1–0 loss on 15 November, he replaced Willian for the final 20 minutes.

On 7 November 2022, Rodrygo was named in the squad for the 2022 FIFA World Cup.

Personal life

Rodrygo's father, Eric, is a former professional footballer. A right back, he played in several tiers of Brazilian football, the highest of which was Série B.

Career statistics

Club

International

Scores and results list Brazil's goal tally first.

Honours
Real Madrid
La Liga: 2019–20, 2021–22
Supercopa de España: 2019–20, 2021–22
UEFA Champions League: 2021–22
UEFA Super Cup: 2022
FIFA Club World Cup: 2022

Individual
Campeonato Paulista Best Newcomer: 2018
Goal.com NxGN: 2020
IFFHS Men's Youth (U20) World Team: 2020, 2021

References

External links
Real Madrid profile
Un1que Football profile 
Santos FC profile 

2001 births
Living people
People from Osasco
Brazilian footballers
Association football forwards
Santos FC players
Real Madrid Castilla footballers
Real Madrid CF players
Campeonato Brasileiro Série A players
Segunda División B players
La Liga players
Brazil youth international footballers
Brazil under-20 international footballers
Brazil international footballers
Brazilian expatriate footballers
Brazilian expatriate sportspeople in Spain
Expatriate footballers in Spain
Footballers from São Paulo (state)
UEFA Champions League winning players
2022 FIFA World Cup players